Hits and Pieces is the first greatest hits album by Australian rock band The Screaming Jets. The album includes tracks from their four studio albums and two new tracks off the band's upcoming album Scam.

The album was released with a limited edition bonus disc titled Rarities It included live tracks recorded in 1991/1992.

Track listing

Bonus disc track listing

Note: tracks 1-4 recorded at The Palais, Newcastle, May 1991
Note: tracks 5-6 were recorded in 1992.

Charts and certifications

Weekly charts

Certifications

References

External links
 "Hits and Pieces" by Sreaming Jets

1999 greatest hits albums
The Screaming Jets albums
Compilation albums by Australian artists